Jerry Eubanks (born March 9, 1950) is an American musician best known as the original saxophonist, keyboardist and flautist for The Marshall Tucker Band. His flute and sax solos were a signature of the band. Eubanks left the Marshall Tucker Band in 1996, outlasting most of the surviving original members. As of 2005, he was running a company called Flatwoods Soaps, in Spartanburg, SC.

He is the father of the competitive Call of Duty player James Eubanks, better known as Clayster.

References

1950 births
American flautists
American rock keyboardists
American rock saxophonists
American male saxophonists
Living people
Musicians from Spartanburg, South Carolina
Rock flautists
The Marshall Tucker Band members
21st-century American saxophonists
21st-century American male musicians
21st-century flautists